SPTR may refer to:
 Savannah Port Terminal Railroad, in the US state of Georgia
 Silapathar railway station, in India
 South Park: Tenorman's Revenge, a video game
 South Pole TDRSS Relay, a telecommunication system at the Amundsen-Scott South Pole Station; see Amundsen–Scott South Pole Station: Operation